Whitefield College may refer to:

 Whitefield College of the Bible, in Banbridge, Northern Ireland
 George Whitefield College, in Cape Town, South Africa
 Geneva Reformed Seminary, in Greenville, South Carolina, formerly known as Whitefield College of the Bible
 Whitefield College in Lakeland, Florida, which functions as the undergraduate degree program of Whitefield Theological Seminary